The 1996 South African Figure Skating Championships was a National Championships in figure skating. Skaters competed in the disciplines of men's and ladies' singles at the senior, novice, and pre-novice levels. There were also junior and juvenile ladies' competition.

Senior results

Men

Ladies

External links
 Results

South African Figure Skating Championships, 1996
South African Figure Skating Championships